Elections to Colchester Borough Council took place in May 1992. These were on the same day as other local elections across the United Kingdom.

Summary

Ward results

Berechurch

Castle

Dedham

East Donyland

Fordham

Harbour

Lexden

Marks Tey

Mile End

New Town

Prettygate

Shrub End

No Green (2.3%) or Labour (24.6%) candidates as previous.

St. Andrew's

St. Anne's

St. John's

St. Mary's

Stanway

Tiptree

West Mersea

No Independent candidate as previous (11.9%).

Wivenhoe

References

1992
1992 English local elections
1990s in Essex